Tarabya (or ; 22 December 1368 –  25 November 1400) was king of Ava for about seven months in 1400. He was the heir apparent from 1385 to 1400 during his father King Swa Saw Ke's reign. He was a senior commander in Ava's first three campaigns (1385−91) against Hanthawaddy Pegu in the Forty Years' War. He was assassinated seven months into his rule by his one-time tutor, Gov. Thihapate of Tagaung. The court executed the usurper, and gave the throne to Tarabya's half-brother Min Swe.

Tarabya is remembered as the Mintara nat spirit in the Burmese official pantheon of nats.

Early life
The future king was born in Ava (Inwa) on 22 December 1368 to King Swa Saw Ke of Ava and Queen Shin Saw Gyi (or Queen Khame Mi). Because he was born on the same day as the birth of a white elephant, considered highly propitious symbol of Burmese monarchs, he was given the title "Hsinbyushin" (Lord of the White Elephant). The name was retained although the baby white elephant died soon after. His nickname was Min Na-Kye ("Lord Wide Ears"). He had either two full siblings (one younger brother and one younger sister) or four full siblings (one younger brother and three younger sisters).

Swa Saw Ke groomed his eldest surviving son to be his heir-apparent. But Tarabya saw his two younger half-siblings, Min Swe and Theiddat who were Swa's sons by a concubine as rivals. Because Tarabya kept picking on his half-siblings, the king had to send his two younger sons away from the Ava Palace in 1381/82. Nonetheless,  April 1385, the king appointed Hsinbyushin his heir-apparent, and married him to Min Hla Myat, the only daughter of the powerful Gov. Thilawa of Yamethin.

Heir-apparent
The only extant record of his years as the heir-apparent concerns his military service in the first part (1385−91) of Forty Years' War. The war was Swa's attempt to take over a divided Mon-speaking kingdom in Lower Burma. Its young king Razadarit controlled only the province, and was facing two rebellions in Martaban and in the Irrawaddy delta.

Tarabya was the overall commander of the 1385–86 campaign which came close to defeating Razadarit. The Ava forces missed their opportunity to finish off Razadarit as Min Swe, the commander of the Second Army, disobeyed Tarabya's order. (Although he and Min Swe were the commanders-in-chief of the two invasion armies, they were aided by Ava's best commanders, including Tarabya's father-in-law Thilawa and Theinkhathu Saw Hnaung.) Tarabya was second-in-command in the next Hanthawaddy campaigns. His army did not achieve any meaning battlefield successes in either of those campaigns. The war then entered a hiatus in early 1391 as the two sides agreed to a truce.

Reign
In April 1400, King Swa died, and Tarabya succeeded. But Tarabya's reign was short. According to the chronicles, he became insane five months into his reign after a hunting trip to Aung Pinle (near modern Mandalay). The king was convinced that the beautiful fairy he made love to in the forest was a representation of Angel Thuyathadi (Saraswati). The king's behavior became totally erratic, and the court now entertained the murmurs of replacing him. Pretenders to the throne began circling. One such pretender, Gov. Yazathingyan of Sagaing had already amassed a force to take over the Ava throne before dying in a freak accident as he disembarked from his war boat at the Ava harbor. The king, who was totally oblivious to the surroundings, was assassinated by his one-time tutor Gov. Thihapate of Tagaung.

Thihapate, known by his given name Nga Nauk Hsan, proclaimed himself king. But the court led by Chief Minister Min Yaza of Wun Zin did not accept the usurper, and executed him. The court gave the throne to Min Swe, who ascended the throne on 25 November 1400.

Veneration as a nat
Because of his violent death, Tarabya entered the official pantheon of nats (spirits) as the Mintara nat. He is portrayed sitting on a throne, wearing his royal garments with a fan in his right hand and his left hand resting on his knee.

Family
Tarabya had two children both by his chief queen Min Hla Myat. His elder child, Min Nyo later became king of Ava from 1425 to 1426. His daughter Min Hla Htut was the first wife of Prince (later King) Thihathu of Ava, and later the chief consort of Gov. Saw Shwe Khet of Prome.

Ancestry
Tarabya was descended from Pagan, Myinsaing and Sagaing royal lines.

Historiography

Notes

References

Bibliography
 
 
 
 
 
 
 
 
 
 

Ava dynasty
1368 births
1400 deaths
07
14th-century Burmese monarchs